In His Life: The John Lennon Story is a 2000 American made-for-television biographical film about John Lennon's teenage years, written by the film's executive producer, Michael O'Hara, and directed by David Carson.

Plot
Beginning in Liverpool in the 1950s, the film concentrates on the early life of John Lennon (Philip McQuillen) as he struggles to become a successful musician in the embryonic stages of British rock and roll. Lennon goes on to form a number of bands, widening his local audience as he develops, before later joining with Stuart Sutcliffe (Lee Williams), George Harrison (Mark Rice-Oxley), Pete Best (Scot Williams) and Paul McCartney (Daniel McGowan) to form the Beatles. The group attract the attention of music promoter Brian Epstein (Jamie Glover) who engineers their success and fame. However, Sutcliffe leaves the band to pursue a career in painting, and Best is dropped from the band to be replaced by Ringo Starr (Kristian Ealey).

The film focuses on eight years of Lennon's youth, from age 16 to 23, from his teenage years living with his aunt Mimi Smith at 251 Menlove Avenue to the early successes of the Beatles. It deals with Lennon's abandonment by his father, the double loss of his mother (first to another family and then to an accident), his introduction to McCartney at St. Peter's Church Hall, his courting and marriage to his first wife, Cynthia (Gillian Kearney), being disowned by his family after his aunt Mimi learned he got Cynthia pregnant outside of marriage, the loss of his best friend Sutcliffe, the birth of his son Julian, and the early popularity of the Beatles in Germany.

Also shown are recreated scenes from the Quarrymen, the German era, and the Cavern Club performances. The film ends with the Beatles' first appearance on The Ed Sullivan Show.

Main cast
 Philip McQuillan as John Lennon
 Blair Brown as Mimi Smith
 Christine Kavanagh as Julia Lennon
 Gillian Kearney as Cynthia Lennon
 Daniel McGowan as Paul McCartney
 Mark Rice-Oxley as George Harrison
 Lee Williams as Stuart Sutcliffe (the original Beatles bassist)
 Jamie Glover as Brian Epstein (the Beatles' manager)
 Kristian Ealey as Ringo Starr
 Scot Williams as Pete Best (the original drummer of the Beatles)
 Palina Jonsdottir as Astrid Kirchherr (Stuart Sutcliffe's German girlfriend and photographer)
 Michael Ryan as Rory Quinn
 Alex Cox as Bruno Koschmider
 Anthony Borrows as young John Lennon
 Paul Usher as "Freddie" Lennon

Production
The film script is written by Michael O'Hara, a former NBC publicity agent who began writing screenplays in 1989 and went into film production in 1991, usually writing and producing TV films for his old employer, NBC.

The film was largely shot in Liverpool, and includes inside and outside scenes from the 251 Menlove Avenue house where Lennon grew up; St Peter's Church Hall, where he first met McCartney; Liverpool College of Art and Quarry Bank High School, where Lennon was a pupil; as well as numerous musical venues where the early Beatles performed. It was the first time the owner of the Menlove Avenue house allowed a film crew inside, and also allowed them to knock down a downstairs wall to make room for the cameras. This resulted in 150 bricks, which later were sold to Beatles' fans.

Awards and nominations
The film was nominated for an award in 2001 for "Best Edited Motion Picture for Commercial Television", by the American Cinema Editors.

References

External links
 In His Life: The John Lennon Story at the Internet Movie Database

In His Life: The John Lennon Story at Moviefone

2000 films
2000 television films
2000 biographical drama films
Biographical films about musicians
Films scored by Dennis McCarthy
Films set in the 1950s
Films set in the 1960s
Films about John Lennon
Films about the Beatles
Films directed by David Carson
Films set in Liverpool
Films shot in Merseyside
John Lennon
Television programmes about the Beatles
2000 drama films
American drama films
American television films
2000s American films
2000s British films
British drama television films